Eochroa is a monotypic moth genus in the family Saturniidae erected by Felder in 1874. Its only species, Eochroa trimenii, was also described by Felder in the same year. They inhabit arid rocky areas and mountain passes in Africa where the host plant grows.

Description
It is a small (wingspan of ), bright pink moth with yellow borders and large eyespots on its wings. Males have disproportionately large antennae. Larvae are cream with irregular black stripes and short black spines and feed on various species of Melianthus. Adults appear in autumn.

References

Saturniinae
Moths of Africa
Moths described in 1874
Monotypic moth genera